Jossimar Orlando Calvo Moreno (born 22 July 1994) is a Colombian artistic gymnast, part of the national team. At the 2015 Pan American Games he won three individual gold medals, becoming in the first Colombian to do so. He competed at the 2016 Olympics in Rio de Janeiro. He was the first Colombian gymnast to qualify for an Olympic final, ranking tenth in the All-around event.

References

External links
Jossimar Calvo Moreno at the FIG website.

1994 births
Living people
Colombian male artistic gymnasts
Place of birth missing (living people)
Gymnasts at the 2016 Summer Olympics
Olympic gymnasts of Colombia
Pan American Games medalists in gymnastics
Pan American Games gold medalists for Colombia
Pan American Games silver medalists for Colombia
Pan American Games bronze medalists for Colombia
Gymnasts at the 2015 Pan American Games
South American Games gold medalists for Colombia
South American Games silver medalists for Colombia
South American Games bronze medalists for Colombia
South American Games medalists in gymnastics
Competitors at the 2014 South American Games
Competitors at the 2018 South American Games
Competitors at the 2022 South American Games
Central American and Caribbean Games gold medalists for Colombia
Central American and Caribbean Games silver medalists for Colombia
Central American and Caribbean Games bronze medalists for Colombia
Competitors at the 2018 Central American and Caribbean Games
Competitors at the 2011 Pan American Games
Competitors at the 2015 Pan American Games
Central American and Caribbean Games medalists in gymnastics
Medalists at the 2015 Pan American Games
People from Cúcuta
20th-century Colombian people
21st-century Colombian people